Trafalgar School may refer to:

Trafalgar School for Girls, a private anglophone secondary school in Montreal, Quebec, Canada
The Trafalgar School at Downton, a coeducational secondary school in Downton, Wiltshire, England
Trafalgar School, Portsmouth, a coeducational secondary school in Portsmouth, Hampshire, England
Trafalgar Castle School, a private day and boarding school for girls in Whitby, Ontario, Canada
Trafalgar High School, a coeducational high school in Trafalgar, Victoria, Australia
Trafalgar Middle School (Nelson, British Columbia), a coeducational middle school in Nelson, British Columbia, Canada
Oakville Trafalgar High School, a coeducational secondary school in Oakville, Ontario, Canada
Trafalgar High School (Cape Town), a secondary school in Cape Town, South Africa

See also
Trafalgar (disambiguation)